Kevin Power (born 19 August 1981) is an Irish writer and academic. He currently teaches in the School of English at Trinity College Dublin. He writes regularly for The Sunday Business Post. His novel Bad Day in Blackrock was published by The Lilliput Press, Dublin, in 2008 and filmed in 2012 as What Richard Did. In April 2009 Power received the 2008 Hennessy XO Emerging Fiction Award for his short story "The American Girl" and was shortlisted for RTÉ's Francis MacManus short story award in 2007 for his piece entitled "Wilderness Gothic".  He is the winner of the 2009 Rooney Prize for Irish Literature.

Education
Power graduated from University College Dublin with a BA (2002), an MA (2003), and a PhD in American Literature in 2013.

Bibliography
Bad Day in Blackrock (2010)
White City (2021)
The Written World (forthcoming, May 2022)

References

Reviews
Review in The Irish Times
Review in The Sunday Business Post
Article in The Irish Times

External links
Darran McCann | Staff Profile | DCU
Kevin Power | BusinessPost.ie
Lilliput Press, the author's publisher
Trinity College Dublin Press Release
Simon and Schuster Author Profile

Irish male short story writers
21st-century Irish short story writers
21st-century Irish novelists
Alumni of University College Dublin
1981 births
Living people
Irish male novelists
21st-century Irish male writers